Reshui Township is a township in Dulan County, Haixi Mongol and Tibetan Autonomous Prefecture, Qinghai, western China. It is located at the base of the Jingpeng Pass at approximately  altitude in the Tibetan Plateau. The name of the township literally means "hot water", which may refer to the hot springs in the area.

Reshui is located on the 943 km long Jitong Railway, which was officially connected to National network and fully operative on 12 January 1995. The railway runs from Benhong (0 km)to Zhelimu (943 km). Reshui Town is close to Galadesitai railway station, located at 517 km. This railway was operated by QJ steam engines operating in tandem until Autumn 2005. The railway has many spectacular features, particularly viaducts, and is now dieselised.

Reshui is in a development phase with many new buildings from 2004 and a new road by pass.

There are several raided burial tombs in a necropolis in Reshui.

The Kangxi Emperor of the Qing Dynasty said the water from Reshui was " holy water as precious as golden spring". Kangxi used to take hot water baths in Reshui after battles. Other emperors have also enjoyed the hot waters of Reshui.

Notes

External links
View of Jitong steam locomotive in Reshui valley, with a goatherd carrying a load of dung on his back in the foreground
video of people playing pool outside alongside a street in Reshui

Haixi Mongol and Tibetan Autonomous Prefecture
Township-level divisions of Qinghai